Linton Township may refer to the following townships in the United States:

 Linton Township, Vigo County, Indiana
 Linton Township, Coshocton County, Ohio
 Linton Township, Allamakee County, Iowa

See also 
 Linton Township High School and Community Building